Rontec is the 3rd largest independent operator of petrol stations in the United Kingdom, with around 260 sites.  The company is headquartered in Watford.

Some sites are branded Shop'n Drive, and others are branded Morrisons Daily in a partnership with the supermarket chain.

History
The company was established by Gerald Ronson in 2011 to buy  Total sites, some of which were sold to Shell. In 2019 the company sold £1.5 billion of fuel, and in 2020 this reduced slightly to £1.3 billion.

References

Filling stations in the United Kingdom
Retail companies of the United Kingdom